Erigeron allochrous is an Asian species of flowering plants in the family Asteraceae. It is native to Kazakhstan and Xinjiang in central Asia.

Erigeron allochrous is a perennial, clump-forming herb up to 28 cm (11.2 inches) tall. Its flower heads have lilac ray florets and yellow disc florets.

References

allochrous
Flora of Kazakhstan
Flora of Xinjiang
Plants described in 1957
Taxa named by Victor Botchantsev